Ryan Matthew Serhant (born July 2, 1984) is an American real estate broker, author, and reality television actor. He currently stars on Bravo's television series Million Dollar Listing New York and its spin-off Sell it Like Serhant. Serhant runs his own New York real estate firm.

Early life and education
Serhant was born in Houston, Texas to John and Ellen Serhant. His father is a former Vice Chairman of State Street Global Advisors and advisor to GoldenTree Asset Management. He was raised in Topsfield, Massachusetts, on the North Shore of Massachusetts, along with brothers Jim and Jack Serhant.

Serhant attended the Pingree School. and Hamilton College where he double majored in English literature and theater and was a member of the Delta Kappa Epsilon fraternity. After graduating in 2006, Serhant moved to New York City to launch his acting career, eventually starring as Evan Walsh in 19 episodes of As The World Turns.

Career

Real estate 
In 2008 Serhant ventured into the New York real estate market. During his first year in real estate, he earned just $9,000. After a year-long pursuit, he closed his first major sale of $8.5 million. By 2012, The Real Deal ranked Serhant #15 out of the 100 most successful agents in New York.

Hired at Nest Seekers International in 2008, Serhant became executive vice president and managing director. In 2012, he launched his bi-coastal brokerage team, the Serhant Team, which consists of over 60 people in New York City, New Jersey, Los Angeles, Miami, and the Hamptons. His team specializes in high-end residential condo and co-op sales, homes, and new development sales.

On September 15, 2020, Serhant announced he was starting his own real estate firm, SERHANT. The firm has quickly grown into one of the most active real estate companies in the United States, using their large social media exposure to sell properties.

In April 2021, Ryan Serhant's real estate brokerage, SERHANT reported it is consistently averaging $100 million in sales volume per month for its first six months of business.

Television 
In 2010, Serhant auditioned for the Million Dollar Listing New York (MDLNY) reality show and was cast as one of three real estate agents featured on the show. The first episode of MDLNY aired on Bravo on March 7, 2012, and followed agents Ryan Serhant, Fredrik Eklund, and Michael Lorber across some of New York's most exclusive real estate deals.

Serhant has appeared on CNN, CNBC, FOX, NBC, ABC, and CBS.

Since his debut on Million Dollar Listing, Serhant has also appeared on Inside Amy Schumer. In 2014, he had a supporting role in Noah Baumbach's 2014 film, While We're Young.

In 2017, Serhant produced and launched the Bravo television show Sell It Like Serhant, a spin-off of MDLNY in which he coaches under-performing salespeople, helping them improve their sales skills.

The 9th Season of Million Dollar Listing New York premiered in the spring of 2021, along with a new spin-off show starring Serhant called 'Ryan's Renovation'. The limited series followed Serhant and his family as they renovated their home in Brooklyn.

Books 
On September 18, 2018, the week of his 10-year anniversary in real estate, Serhant debuted his first book, Sell It Like Serhant: How to Sell More, Earn More, and Become the Ultimate Sales Machine, which became a best-seller on the New York Times, Wall Street Journal, and Los Angeles Times book lists.

Sell It Like Serhant: The Course 
On August 15, 2019, Ryan Serhant launched Sell It Like Serhant: The Course, a real estate sales course.

Personal life 
In 2016, Serhant married lawyer Emilia Bechrakis in Corfu, in a Greek church following Serhant's conversion to the Greek Orthodox Church. A four-part mini-series, Million Dollar Listing New York: Ryan’s Wedding chronicled the event and aired on Bravo in the fall of 2016. They have one daughter, born 2019. In 2021, the couple finished a 3-year renovation of a $7.8 million townhouse in Boerum Hill, Brooklyn; the renovation experience was documented in a Bravo four-part mini-series, Million Dollar Listing: Ryan's Renovation, which aired in June 2021.

Filmography

Television

Film

References

External links

1984 births
21st-century American businesspeople
21st-century American male actors
21st-century American male writers
21st-century American non-fiction writers
American male film actors
American male non-fiction writers
American male soap opera actors
American real estate brokers
Businesspeople from Massachusetts
Businesspeople from New York City
Hamilton College (New York) alumni
Living people
Male actors from Massachusetts
Male actors from New York City
People from Boerum Hill, Brooklyn
People from Topsfield, Massachusetts
Pingree School alumni
Television personalities from New York City
Writers from Massachusetts
Writers from Brooklyn